The 1978 Virginia Slims of Seattle  was a women's tennis tournament played on indoor carpet courts at the Seattle Center Arena  in Seattle, Washington in the United States that was part of the 1978 Virginia Slims World Championship Series. It was the second edition of the tournament and was held from February 6 through February 12, 1978. First-seeded Martina Navratilova won the singles title and earned $20,000 first-prize money.

Finals

Singles
 Martina Navratilova defeated  Betty Stöve 6–1, 1–6, 6–1
 It was Navratilova's 1st singles title of the year and the 14th of her career.

Doubles
 Kerry Melville Reid /  Wendy Turnbull defeated  Patricia Bostrom /  Marita Redondo 6–2, 6–3

Prize money

References

External links
 Women's Tennis Association (WTA) tournament details
 International Tennis Federation (ITF) tournament edition details

Virginia Slims of Seattle
Virginia Slims of Seattle
Virginia Slims of Seattle
Virginia Slims of Seattle
Tennis in Washington (state)